National Institute of Pharmaceutical Education and Research, Hajipur (NIPER Hajipur) is a public pharmaceutical education and research university located in Hajipur, Bihar, India. Established in 2007, it is one of the seven National Institutes of Pharmaceutical Education and Research (NIPERs) under India's Ministry of Chemicals and Fertilizers. The institute offers Post Graduate degree in pharmaceutical sciences. Like all other NIPERs, it has the Institute of National Importance status.

History

The institution started functioning from November 2007 and was inaugurated by former union Minister Sri Ram Vilas Paswan and the Director Dr. Pradeep Das, RMRIMS-Patna. Till October, 2018 the institute was under the mentorship of RMRIMS-Patna and Dr. Pradeep Das was the Project Director of NIPER-Hajipur.

Organization and administration

Governance

Dr. V. Ravichandiran, the Director of NIPER-Kolkata is also the Director (additional charge) of NIPER-Hajipur. He has taken this additional charge since January, 2020. NIPER-Hajipur has 9 faculties and 4 non-teaching staff currently.

Departments

Pharmacology and toxicology

Department started functioning from 2018. The department has fully developed laboratory along with animal house facility.

Areas of Research

 Cognito- behavioral studies including Fluorosis-induced neurodevelopmental disorders.
 Anticancer research with electrochemical therapy, immunotherapy and chemotherapy approaches
 Role of extracellular vesicles (Exosomes) in drug-tolerant persister cells and its contribution to cancer-initiating cells in breast cancer.
 To study the molecular reprogramming landscape of pre and post neoadjuvant chemotherapy in Gastric Cancer and its therapeutic implications in Humanized mice   for the 3D organoid model.

Department of Biotechnology

The department started functioning from 2007. It has already awarded 10 PhD degree and 6 students have submitted.

Areas of Research

  Chromosome organization and regulation of transcription in pathogenic organisms
  mechanism of drug resistance and development of effective drugs against resistant microbes
  Application of functionalized and conjugated gold Nanoparticles for improved antimicrobial efficacy.
  Green synthesized gold nanoparticles as antifungal and anti-parasitic agents.

Department of Pharmacy Practice 

It started functioning from 2007. The department has affiliation with major hospitals for clinical and applied pharmacy. The department has already awarded 1 PhD degree and 1 student has submitted.

Areas of Research

 Exploration of nutritional and immunological factors along with quality of life in patients of visceral leishmaniasis.
 Exploration of cardiovascular risk along with quality of life and KAP study in patients with HIV/VL co-infection in Bihar
 Evaluation of Efficacy and Toxicity of Concurrent Capecitabine with Radiation in Locally Advanced Rectal Cancer Patients of Bihar.
 Assessment of Risk Factors and Management of Post Kala Azar Dermal Leishmaniasis

Academics

Admissions

Every year in June and July NIPER conducts national level entrance examinations for admissions to its M.S.(Pharm)/M. Pharm. and PhD programs and the doctoral programs are further screened by personal interview. The candidates are required to have qualified the Graduate Aptitude Test in Engineering (GATE) or now Graduate Pharmacy Aptitude Test (GPAT) in a suitable subject area. The MS course is 2 years with 4 semesters. Students with individual fellowship can apply directly to their choice of NIPERs for PhD.

Student life

The students joining Hajipur represent almost every state of India and come from diverse sections of society. Till date 382 PG students have received their degree from NIPER-Hajipur Most of them have been placed in pharma industries, while some are pursuing higher studies in various universities/ institutions across the globe. Among the graduated students most students are involved in research in various Institutions like IISc Bangalore, NII-Delhi, NISER, Bose Institute, IICB, NIPERs, etc. So far 11 scholars have completed their Ph.D. successfully from NIPER-Hajipur and 6 students have submitted their thesis. 17 more students are already involved in active PhD program. In the next academic year two new departments Pharmaceutics and Pharmaceutical analysis is proposed to be opened at NIPER-Hajipur.

NIPER Hajipur has so far published 79 research papers in high impact, peer reviewed journals. It has signed 3 MoUs and ready to sign many more for academic and research collaborations. NIPER –Hajipur wants to build a state of art central Instrumental facility to carry out high quality research empowering development of highly skilled manpower for pharmaceutical Industries in future. NIPER-Hajipur has academic collaboration with many Institutes like RMRIMS-Patna, IIT-Patna, CDRI-Lucknow, NIT-Patna Mahavir Cancer Sansthan-Patna, IGIMS-Patna, NIPER-Guwahati, NIPER-Kolkata etc.

Separate Boys and Girls hostel facility is available inside the campus. Also hired hostel facility is available outside the campus based on need. All the hostels are equipped with 24 hr generator facility and security guards. Transportation and Internet facility is available 24x7. Canteen and mess is run by students.

References

Education in Hajipur
Universities and colleges in Bihar
National Institute of Pharmaceutical Education and Research
Educational institutions established in 2007
2007 establishments in Bihar
Research institutes in Bihar